The final round of the EuroBasket Women 2021 took place between 21 and 27 June 2021.

Qualified teams
The group winners qualified for the quarterfinals while the second-and third placed teams advanced to the qualification round.

Bracket
Class. games to WWCQTs

Qualification to quarterfinals

Italy vs Sweden

Bosnia and Herzegovina vs Croatia

Russia vs Slovenia

Spain vs Montenegro

Quarterfinals

Belarus vs Sweden

France vs Bosnia and Herzegovina

Belgium vs Russia

Serbia vs Spain

Classification games

Sweden vs Bosnia and Herzegovina

Spain vs Russia

Semifinals

Belarus vs France

Serbia vs Belgium

Third place game

Final

References

External links
Official website

Final round